Michael Omer (born June 20, 1979) is an Israeli author of crime, thriller, horror and fantasy. His books were translated to over 14 languages and have sold more than a million copies. He is a New York Times bestseller, The Washington Post bestseller, and was the second most read Kindle book of the year 2018. Omer has received the LiveLib Readers' Choice Award for Detective Fiction, The Russian Detective Prize, and Thomas & Mercer Silver Raven Award.

Early life 
Michael Omer was born in Jerusalem in 1979. Both his parents are psychologists. His father, Haim Omer, is a professor of psychology at the Tel Aviv University. Mike has four siblings, one of his brothers is the artist Noam Omer. At age six his family relocated to Boston for a year for his father's post-doctorate, where Omer acquired his fluent English. Later the family returned to Israel and settled in Hod HaSharon.

From a young age Omer showed a talent for writing and was a voracious reader of science fiction and fantasy.

As Michael Omer

Early works 
At age 16, after reading Douglas Adams's The Hitchhiker's Guide to the Galaxy, and Terry Pratchett's Discworld series, Omer decided to try and write a novel. The result, The Geography of the End of the World was published in 1995 by Israeli publisher Opus, where Omer was the publishing house's youngest author.

Omer became one of a "handful Israeli authors of science fiction and fantasy," a genre that is rather undeveloped in the small country.

By age 18 Omer joined Israel's mandatory military service, where he served for three years in the Artillery Corps. Later, he admitted that due to his military service his writing became darker. While in his military service he published his second novel The Duck Attack, published in 1999. The Duck Attack expanded on Omer's fascination with comic fantasy, and was aimed at young adults.

Upon completing his military service, Omer took some of his army experiences and began writing social commentary about Israeli society and culture. This eventually led to him launching a social satire website platform in 2009. The website, Loof Columns, which was discontinued a few years later, showcased Omer's satirical work, as well as columns by fellow writers. Among other issues in Israeli society that Omer tackled were Israel's unique reserve duty culture, Israel's Prime Minister Netanyahu's incompetence in controlling his ministers, the typical Israeli's "pushy" temperament, and the overall absurd human condition in the 21st century.

In 2011 Omer joined Shahar Kober and Ziv Botzer and set to write the script for a computer game the three developed together, titled "Misfortune". Over two years Omer wrote the main plot of the game, experimenting in worldbuilding and characterization. Online magazine Gamasutra noted the game's storytelling: "Unlike many other [...] games, the main emphasis of Misfortune is the plot. As the game progresses, a complex story unfolds, including multiple plot-lines that intertwine together."Omer later said that working on the complex worldbuilding of Misfortune was a gargantuan yet incredibly satisfying task. The game was designed to last months and supply the gamer with multiple crossing story arcs.

The Narrowdale Series 
Following the positive reviews of Misfortune, Omer set on writing a complex story, to be epic in scale and written as a multiple-part series. Focusing on young adults, like his previous books, Omer decided to venture into the then-uncommon world of interactive books. His aim was to write an interactive series, in which readers would be encouraged to visit external links that expand on the novel's universe.

The result, Nedudey Shena (in Hebrew: Insomnia) was to be an interactive book, with supplemental short films. A subsequent bidding war ensued, which resulted in a unique collaboration between Israel's two leading publishers, Kinneret Zmora-Bitan and Keter Publishing House.

For the purpose of the supplemental short films for the book, and in order to stay loyal to the original manuscript, Omer was asked by the publishers to adapt the screenplay elements. Omer, who had previously never written a screenplay, applied himself to the study of cinematography, thinking in storyboard terms rather than in literary narrative, and applying the tropes of supernatural thrillers. Omer approached the task inspired by the TV series Eerie, Indiana.

The outcome was a hybrid between a book and a film, an interactive book. Haaretz Book Review noted the book's unique interactive nature; Omer has produced a separate website in which the main character from the novel published her video blog. According to Ynet, Omer "succeeded in creating the necessary suspense, and spiced it up with the right amount of horror." A year later the book was translated into English as Sleepless, and was Omer's first book to be published in English.

Following the success of Sleepless, Omer expanded upon the universe of the town of Narrowdale portrayed in the book, and wrote the sequel Moth to a Flame, which was followed by The Buzzing.

As Mike Omer

Glenmore Park 
By age 35 Omer has written six books under his given name, all of which were in the fantasy genre. After twenty years of writing, beginning with the publishing of The Geography of the End of the World in 1996, Omer felt constrained by the genre. "As a teenager, I had entered the world of writing fantasy thinking it would give me freedom, yet over the years it felt rather confining," he later told Yaron London.

Omer, wishing to break the genre's constraints, decided to venture into realism. In order to differentiate between his old writing genre and the new venture, he decided to use a pen-name for the books to follow. The new pen-name he adapted was Mike Omer.

Using his previous experience of worldbuilding, he created a contemporary American town, situated in Massachusetts. "I wanted to create a setting that would emphasise human relationships in all their flawed nature. A world filled with past-traumas, obsessive nature and crimes induced by passion."

The fictional city subsequently developed, Glenmore Park, was to be featured in his following three novels. The first novel in the series, Spider's Web, was published in 2016. The novel was followed by Deadly Web, and Web of Fear, comprising the series Glenmore Park, which later served as the basis for the Zoe Bentley series.

The Zoe Bentley Trilogy 
While writing Spider's Web, Omer included a side-character named Zoe Bentley, a young FBI profiler. Omer later admitted that from the very beginning the character had a distinct voice, which he was intrigued by. She was blunt, abrasive, and confident with her opinions and expertise. "I wanted to focus on Zoe's journey and figure out what makes her tick."

Zoe fascinated Omer partially because of her obsession with serial killers. For the purpose of writing the series Omer read Whoever Fights Monsters by Robert Ressler, as well as Mindhunter: Inside the FBI's Elite Serial Crime Unit by John E. Douglas. He also conducted research about Jeffrey Dahmer, Richard Chase, Ted Bundy and other serial killers. He dedicated the coming book to his wife, "for understanding that serial killers are a valid discussion for our anniversary vacation."

Due to the success of the Glenmore Park series, Omer was approached by a literary agent, who facilitated a contract with Thomas & Mercer. The new manuscript, A Killer's Mind, was subsequently published by them a year later.

The sequel In the Darkness was published in 2019, followed by Thicker Than Blood in 2020.

A Deadly Influence 
In March 2021 Omer published A Deadly Influence. The book, according to Kirkus Reviews, was "An expert ticking-clock suspenser best consumed in one prodigious gulp.” Publishers Weekly noted the series debut as "smart".

As Alex Rivers 
From his first book,The Geography at the End of the World, first published at age 16, Omer was attracted to writing fantasy. However, with the success of his crime thrillers, Omer veered away from the genre. Nevertheless, he continued to be a voracious reader of fantasy. In 2016, after reading C. N. Crawford's The Vampire's Mage Series, Omer was inspired to venture again into writing in the fantasy genre.

Following correspondence between Crawford and Omer, the two decided to collaborate in a similar fashion to Terry Pratchett and Neil Gaiman, who co-wrote Good Omens. The result was an urban fantasy book titled Agent of Enchantment, which revolved around an FBI profiler chasing a Fae serial killer.

To avoid reader confusion between his crime thrillers and his new urban fantasy book, Omer chose a pen name, Alex Rivers.

Following the success of Agent of Enchantment, Crawford and Omer further collaborated on three additional sequels, Agent of Chaos, Agent of Darkness, and Agent of the Fae. The rights for the series in French were subsequently bought by the French Infinity publishing house.

Omer's fascination with alchemy led him to write another novel under the Alex Rivers pen-name, revolving around a modern-day alchemist living in Boston. Stolen Soul was subsequently published a year later, and was followed by Hunter's Soul and A Soul Unchained.

Books

As Michael Omer

As Mike Omer

As Alex Rivers

Awards 
LiveLib Readers' Choice Award for Detective Fiction, 2020
The Russian Detective Prize
Geffen Award Anthology, 2016

References

External links

Israeli male writers
21st-century Israeli writers
Living people
Israeli novelists
Year of birth missing (living people)
Israeli thriller writers
Israeli crime fiction writers
Crime fiction writers